Andrew Lawson (1873 – ?) was an Australian politician. He was born in Bendigo, Victoria. In 1922 he was elected to the Tasmanian Legislative Council as the Independent member for Gordon, serving until his defeat in 1928.

References

1873 births
Year of death missing
Independent members of the Parliament of Tasmania
Members of the Tasmanian Legislative Council
People from Bendigo
20th-century Australian politicians